In Roman mythology, Canens was the personification of song.  A nymph from Latium, she was the daughter of Janus and Venilia.

Because Canens' husband Picus scorned the love of the witch Circe, she turned him into a woodpecker. Canens searched for her husband for six days and then threw herself into the Tiber river.  She sang one final song and then died.  They had one son, Faunus.

References

Sources
 Ovid Metamorphoses 14.320-434

Nymphs
Personifications in Roman mythology
Metamorphoses characters
Music and singing goddesses